Fisher College is a private college in Boston, Massachusetts. The college is accredited by the New England Commission of Higher Education (NECHE).

History
Fisher College first opened its doors in 1903, founded by Myron C. Fisher and Edmund H. Fisher under the name Winter Hill Business College in the predominantly working-class city of Somerville, Massachusetts, just two miles north of Boston. The school traces its roots to educational entrepreneurs Myron and Edmund Fisher, who believed the immigrants of that city in the early 1900s should have an opportunity to advance beyond unskilled labor jobs. Fisher College moved to its current Beacon Street location in 1939. The Beacon Street site is featured on the Boston Women's Heritage Trail. During the 1940s, the college was split into two separate entities: The Fisher School for Men and The Fisher School for Women. 

In 1952, the Board of Regents of Higher Education of the Commonwealth of Massachusetts approved Fisher as a two-year college, and five years later it was given degree-granting powers. In 1970, Fisher gained accreditation from the New England Association of Schools and Colleges and operates as an independent, non-profit educational institution.

The Division of Graduate and Professional Studies was established in 1975 to serve the adult population of Eastern Massachusetts. Fisher College began offering online courses and degrees in 1998. In 1999, the College's first bachelor's degree – the Bachelor of Science in Management – was offered, and in 2015 the College's first master's – a Master of Business Administration with a focus on strategic leadership – was accredited.

Presidents

Academics
Fisher College offers graduate programs, including a Master of Business Administration (MBA) with a concentration in Strategic Leadership, bachelor's and associate degrees, and certifications.

Student demographics

As of Fall 2022, student population at Fisher College is 1,421, including Graduate and Professional Studies enrollments. Fifty percent of Fisher College students on-campus in Boston were from Massachusetts, 8% from the remaining New England area, 17% international, and 25% from other states in the U.S.  -- 52% male and 48% female.

Athletics
The Fisher athletic teams are called the Falcons. The college is a member of the National Association of Intercollegiate Athletics (NAIA), primarily competing as an NAIA Independent within the Continental Athletic Conference since the 2012–13 academic year. The Falcons previously competed in the American Mideast Conference during the 2011–12 school year and in the Sunrise Conference from 2002–03 to 2010–11.

Fisher competes in 10 intercollegiate varsity sports. Men's sports include baseball, basketball, cross country, soccer and volleyball while women's sports include basketball, cross country, soccer, softball and volleyball.

References

External links
 Official website
 Official athletics website

 
Educational institutions established in 1903
Universities and colleges in Boston
Liberal arts colleges in Massachusetts
1903 establishments in Massachusetts
Private universities and colleges in Massachusetts